Lampronia aeneella is a moth of the family Prodoxidae. It is found in western Austria.

The wingspan is about 15 mm.

References

External links
Lepiforum.de

Prodoxidae
Moths described in 1870
Moths of Europe
Taxa named by Hermann von Heinemann